The Miaoli Railway Museum is a railway park in Miaoli City, Miaoli County, Taiwan.

History
The museum will open up a new railway park within its vicinity in 2023, which will display several locomotives and railway-related artifacts. It is build on a 1.91 hectares of land and costs NT$1 billion.

Diesel locomotives
TRA Class R0 diesel-electric locomotive R6
TRA Class S300 diesel-electric locomotive S305 
TRA Class S400 diesel-electric locomotive S405
TRA LDH101 Narrow track 762mm diesel-hydraulic locomotives
Taiwan Alishan Railway 11403-5 diesel-mechanical locomotive
Taiwan Alishan Railway 11403-1 diesel-mechanical locomotive

Steam locomotives
TRA Class CT150 steam locomotive CT152
TRA Class DT560 steam locomotive DT561
Taiwan Alishan Railway number 28 Shay locomotive
Taiwan Sugar Corporation number 331 tank locomotive

Passenger cars
30SP2502
25TPK2053
LTPB1813
SPC2

Work train
Taiwan Sugar Corporation number 254 Draisine

Railway monuments and historic buildings
Locomotive garage
Railway turntable

Transportation
The museum is in walking distance south of Miaoli Station of the Taiwan Railways.

Gallery

See also
 List of museums in Taiwan

References

1999 establishments in Taiwan
Miaoli City
Museums established in 1999
Museums in Miaoli County
Railway museums in Taiwan